James Dixon (August 5, 1814 – March 27, 1873) was a United States representative and Senator from Connecticut.

Biography
Dixon, son of William & Mary (Field) Dixon, was born August 5, 1814 in Enfield, Connecticut, Dixon pursued preparatory studies, and graduated from Williams College in Williamstown, Massachusetts in 1834, where he had been a charter member of The Kappa Alpha Society. He was elected to Phi Beta Kappa. He studied law, and was admitted to the bar in 1834 and commenced practice in Enfield.

Career
Dixon was a member of the Connecticut House of Representatives in 1837–1838 and 1844, and served as speaker in 1837; he moved to Hartford, Connecticut in 1839 and continued the practice of law. He married Elizabeth Lord Cogswell on October 1, 1840. They had two sons, James Wyllys Dixon and Henry Whitfield Dixon, and two daughters, Elizabeth L. Dixon and Clementine Lydia Dixon.  Clementine was courted (unsuccessfully) by the paleontologist, Othniel Charles Marsh.
She married Dr. James Clarke Welling (1825 - 1894).

Dixon was elected as a representative of Connecticut's 1st District, as a Whig to the House, serving during the Twenty-ninth and Thirtieth Congresses (March 4, 1845 – March 3, 1849),  and was a member of the State house of representatives in 1854. He declined the nomination for Governor of Connecticut in 1854, and was an unsuccessful candidate for United States Senator in 1854.

Dixon was elected as a Republican to the U.S. Senate in 1856, and reelected in 1863, serving from March 4, 1857, to March 3, 1869.

On 16 December 1861, Lyman Trumbull asked the Senate to consider his resolution: "That the Secretary of State be directed to inform the Senate whether, in the loyal States of the Union, any person or persons have been arrested and imprisoned and are now held in confinement by orders from him or his Department; and if so, under what law said arrests have been made, and said persons imprisoned." Dixon, supporting repression, said of the resolution: "it seems to me calculated to produce nothing but mischief".

While in the Senate, he was chairman of the Committee to Audit and Control the Contingent Expenses (Thirty-seventh and Thirty-eighth Congresses) and a member of the Committees on District of Columbia (Thirty-eighth and Thirty-ninth Congresses) and Post Office and Post Roads (Thirty-ninth Congress).  He supported Horatio Seymour in the 1868 United States Presidential Election and was an unsuccessful Democratic candidate for the U.S. Senate and the House of Representatives in 1868, primarily because he had been the first Republican member of the Senate to oppose the impeachment of President Andrew Johnson.

Death
Appointed Minister to Russia in 1869, Dixon declined and engaged in literary pursuits and extensive traveling until his death in Hartford on March 27, 1873. He is interred in Cedar Hill Cemetery.

References

External links
 

Govtrack US Congress
The Political Graveyard

1814 births
1873 deaths
People from Enfield, Connecticut
Whig Party members of the United States House of Representatives from Connecticut
Republican Party United States senators from Connecticut
Connecticut Democrats
Connecticut Republicans
Members of the Connecticut House of Representatives
Politicians from Hartford, Connecticut
Connecticut lawyers
Williams College alumni
Union (American Civil War) political leaders
People of Connecticut in the American Civil War
Burials at Cedar Hill Cemetery (Hartford, Connecticut)
19th-century American lawyers